The Mashantucket Pequot Reservation Archeological District is a historic district in the northeast corner of the town of Ledyard, Connecticut. It is within territory documented as Pequot land in the earliest-known surviving map (1614) of the region. The district was listed on the National Register of Historic Places in 1986 and was declared a National Historic Landmark in 1993.

The district includes a significant portion of lands historically occupied by the Pequot.

In the 1970s the tribe formally filed a land claim suit for the recovery of its land, eventually recovering more than  under a settlement affirmed by an act of Congress. Archaeological investigations into these lands have identified more than fifteen sites of interest. The tribe considers the entire reservation to be archaeologically sensitive, requiring investigation before any significant construction projects take place on its territory.

Materials found at sites investigated on the reservation include aboriginal lithic and quartz stonework, and a variety of colonial trade items believed to date as far back as the 16th century. While the earliest village sites found provide little evidence about housing, by the 18th century the Pequots were documented as living in both traditional wigwam-style structures, as well as European-style wood-frame houses. The archeological evidence of the villages shows they included large (3-4 acre) plots of farmsteads surrounded by stone walls (the walls being one place where objects of interest are often found).

See also
List of National Historic Landmarks in Connecticut
National Register of Historic Places listings in New London County, Connecticut

References

National Historic Landmarks in Connecticut
Archaeological sites in New London County, Connecticut
Archaeological sites in Connecticut
National Register of Historic Places in New London County, Connecticut
Ledyard, Connecticut
Archaeological sites on the National Register of Historic Places in Connecticut
Pequot
Historic districts on the National Register of Historic Places in Connecticut
1666 establishments in Connecticut